Old Neredmet is a locality and also origin of Neredmet,  
it also has its own fort, walls, watch tower ruins at Neredmet Gadi (Fort).
The neighbourhood of Hyderabad city is in the Indian state of Telangana. It is located in Malkajgiri Mandal in Medchal-Malkajgiri district of the state. Ward No. 140- Malkajgiri (Half). Neredmet Grama Bodrai (Built Before 1880's) is at Old Neredmet Village, Neredmet Moodu Gullu is the landmark for Old Neredmet Area.

History of Neredmet
It was founded in 1578 AD, But population increased from development of RK Puram lake also known as (Munkidigan Cheruvu). Old Neredmet Village has its own fort, walls, watch tower ruins, at Neredmet Gaddi (Fort).

By the early 1800s, the Electronics and Mechanical Engineering (EME), which is presently the Military College of Electronics and Mechanical Engineering (MCEME), had been set up at Trimulgherry. The engineers and electricians who worked here needed water, so RK Puram Lake was commissioned by the Nizam and dug up in the mid-1800s, occupying a space of around 100 acres.

Speaking to TNM, Murali Chemuturi, a writer and long-time resident of the area, narrates, “Mudfort, which is now just the name of an area, was the first place where the East India Company built its garrison. Over time, the garrison expanded, and soon it had spread all the way up to Bolaram.”

By the early 1800s, the Electronics and Mechanical Engineering (EME), which is presently the Military College of Electronics and Mechanical Engineering (MCEME), had been set up.

Though it is now a populated area in the city, this was the time that people first settled in then Neredmet village.

“The engineers and electricians who worked there needed two main services. First, they had dry toilets and needed someone for manual scavenging, and secondly, they needed milk and food. For the first, they hired some Scheduled Caste people from Tamil Nadu and for the second purpose, they hired Yadavs (a cattle-breeding caste), from Uttar Pradesh,” Murali says.

“The two groups were housed nearby, and while Neredmet became the village
RK Puram was the hamlet where the SC persons stayed,” he adds.

All three of these groups needed water, so the RK Puram Lake was commissioned by the Nizam and dug up in the mid-1800s, occupying a space of around 100 acres.

After the sepoy mutiny in 1857, the British continued to expand aggressively, and the area's population began to grow.

The lake remained a major source of drinking water and largely clean, until the late 1960s, when the Electronics Corporation of India Limited (ECIL) was established.

“There was no shortage of water, which is why the old houses in RK Puram have no well or borewell. In 1965, Sainik Nagar was the first colony to be allotted. Despite this, the lake remained clean, as the colony remained downstream of the lake,” says Murali.

“After ECIL came up, the politicians of the time laid a road right through the lake, to create a shortcut. In 1976, the lake flooded the road, following which it was raised by 5 feet by the gram panchayat with the help of mud and stones,” he adds.

According to locals, this was when a large portion of the lake was killed, as the water that was cut off from the rest of the lake, was eventually dumped with debris and flattened.

“However, it was only in the mid-80s that things started going downhill, as several colonies like GK Colony, Sri Colony, Bank Colony and Bhagat Singh Nagar were built upstream, and untreated sewage started flowing directly into the lake,” Murali says.

Localities in Old Neredmet 
The Neredmet Village has three villages within its  main village. They are Ramakrishnapuram Hamlet, Safilgudem Hamlet & Neredmet Main Village.

Ramakrishapuram is a second settlement & Safilgudem third Settlement of Neredmet Village.

 Old Neredmet Village (Including  Neredmet Gadi (Fort),Hydergudem Basti, Yadav Basti, Harjan Basti, Kindi Basti,Mallanna Swamy Temple Area, Chipirinllu Basthi) (These areas are first Settlements of Neredmet) .
Panduloan Board Hills (Soudalamma Ancient Temple Area)
 Keshawa Nagar (Neredmet Old Police Station)
 Bhagath singh Nagar
 New Vidhya Nagar 
 Ram Brahma Nagar Colony
 Devi Nagar Colony
 Sainik Nagar Colony
 Seetaram Nagar Colony
 Sri krishna Nagar Colony
 Adarsh Nagar Colony
 Shirdi Sai Colony
 Adithya Nagar Colony
 LB Nagar
 Krupa Complex
 Balram Nagar Colony
 Dinakar Nagar Colony
 Tarak Ram Nagar
 Vinayak Nagar

Educational institutions 
 Government District Educational Institute Training Of Neredmet Hyderabad - DEIT is at Old Neredmet.
 Neredmet ZP HIGH SCHOOL at Neredmet Old Village.
 DAV School, Chandragiri Colony.
 Nalanda High School Chandragiri Colony.
 St. Little Teresa High School, Safilguda Road.
 Sri Vani Niketan High School, Aadarsh Nagar, LB Nagar, Neredmet.
 Bashyam school Neredmet Branch at Old Neredmet.
 SR Digi School Neredmet Branch at Old Neredmet.
 Rajadhani Model High school at Old Neredmet.
 Sri Rama Krishna Vidya Bhavan Old Neredmet.
 Little Scholars High School Old Neredmet.
 Government Junior College Vajpayee Nagar, Neredmet.
 Government Degree College Vajpayee Nagar, Neredmet.
 Nagendra Public School
 St Marks Grammar High School
 Little Pearls High School, Neredmet
 Kairali Vidya Bhavan School, Kakatiya Nagar, Neredmet Old PS
 Helen Keller's Institute for Research and Rehabilitation for the disabled children
 Indian High School GK colony, Neredmet
 Bhavans College Neredmet, Neredmet X Roads

Railway/MMTS Stations/Bus Stands

BUS BAYS: 
 R K Puram Rythu Bazar
 Neredmet Old Police station
 Old Neredmet Three Temples
 Vinayaka Nagar X Roads
 Vinayaka Nagar Railway Gate
 Krupa Complex
 Safilguda X Roads

RAILWAY/MMTS STATIONS:
 Ramakrishna Puram Railway Station
 Safilguda Railway Station

Religious places 
 Sri Baala Aanjaneya Swamy Devasthanam Old Neredmet Village.
 Gadi(Fort) Maisaamma Temple at Neredmet Fort Ruins.
 Soudaamma Anicent Temple (800 years Old) Hill top, Near Panduloan Board, Neredmet.
 Sri Muthyalamma - Chittharamma - Durgaamma Devalayam  Old Neredmet Village
 Grama Bodrai Old Neredmet Village
 Aashur Khana - Peerla Kottam Old Neredmet.
 Sri Komuravelli Mallana Swamy Temple - Beside Andhra Bank, Old Neredmet Village.
 Chanda Bibi Masjid Old Neredmet Village
 Old Neredmet Village Dargah
 Moodu Gullu Devasthanam (Sri Nallapochamma, Mahankali, Muthyalamma ) Temple  Old Neredmet Village.
 Sri Kasi Vishwanath Swamy Temple, Neredmet 1st Main Road, Old Neredmet Village.
 Sri Varasidhi Vinayaka Swamy Devalayam - Chandragiri Colony, Safilguda, Neredmet.
 Sri Vijayadurga Katta Maisamma Yellamma Temple Safilguda Lake Park Road, Neredmet.
 Sri Shabarimala Ayyappa Swamy Temple, Chanakyapuri, Safilguda, Neredmet.
 Santoshimaa Temple Old Safilguda, Neredmet.
 Sri Vinayaka Temple Chandragiri Colony, Safilguda, Neredmet.
 Hyderabad Kalibari Vivekanandapuram Colony, Neredmet.
 Bethel Marthoma Church - Old Neredmet
 El-Shaddai Prayer House

References

Secunderabad
Neighbourhoods in Hyderabad, India